Road routes in Western Australia assist drivers navigating roads in urban, rural, and scenic areas of the state. The route numbering system is composed of National Highways, National Routes, State Routes, and Tourist Drives. Each route has a unique number, except for National Highway 1 and National Route 1, which mark Highway 1 in Western Australia. Routes are denoted on directional signs and roadside poles by appropriately numbered markers, the design of which varies according to route type.

National Highways and National Routes are designated by the Federal Government along roads of national importance, whilst State Routes and Tourist Drives are designated by the State Government. Highways and some arterial roads are controlled and maintained by Main Roads Western Australia, although National Highways are federally funded. The remaining roads are generally the responsibility of local governments, though there are also some private roads and Department of Environment and Conservation roads.

Many major roads in Perth and in rural Western Australia are not assigned a route number. Not many routes have been added since the 1990s; exceptions include the Graham Farmer Freeway, Mandjoogoordap Drive and Port Gregory Road/George Grey Drive.

National Highways and Routes
National Highways are designated with gold numbers on a green shield.  These are federally funded highways, which are the most direct routes between Perth and other Australian capital cities. Black on white shields indicate National Routes that are not part of the National Highway system. Highway 1 is a route that circumnavigates Australia, joining all mainland state capitals, via roads numbered as National Highway 1 or National Route 1 (or as M1, A1, or B1 in states with an alphanumeric route numbering system).

State Routes
State Routes in Western Australia are designated by a white number on a blue shield. Single digit routes travel completely or partially along urban freeways or highways. Two digit route numbers that end in zero are the major road routes out of Perth, except for Route 10, which designates rural highway connections in the South West region. Other two digit routes connect the urban centres of Perth, while three digit routes connect regional and remote areas of Western Australia.

Tourist Drives

Tourist Drives, designated by white numbers on a brown shield, are routes through areas of scenic or historic significance. Tourist Drives were introduced into Western Australia while Eric Charlton was the state government Minister for Transport in the 1990s. In addition to the Tourist Drives, there are also unnumbered routes such as the Golden Pipeline Heritage Trail, and local governments may designate and maintain local scenic drives, generally unnamed and unnumbered.

Decommissioned routes
Whilst the following routes are decommissioned, the component roads generally still exist as physical roads, but without route signposts.

See also

 List of major roads in Perth, Western Australia
 List of major roads in rural Western Australia
 List of highways in Western Australia

References

Route references

 Distance book (12 ed.), MRWA
 Metropolitan Arterial Roads, WA Land Information Authority
 State Map, WA Land Information Authority

Further reading
 
 
 
 
 

 
Road routes
Road routes